R. J. Reynolds may refer to:
R. J. Reynolds (1850-1918), American businessman and tobacconist
R. J. Reynolds Jr. (1906–1964), American entrepreneur, son of the above
R. J. Reynolds Tobacco Company, tobacco company founded in 1874 by R. J. Reynolds
R. J. Reynolds Memorial Auditorium, in Winston-Salem, North Carolina
Richard J. Reynolds High School, also in Winston-Salem, North Carolina
R. J. Reynolds (baseball), former Major League Baseball player for the Los Angeles Dodgers and Pittsburgh Pirates

Reynolds, R.J.